The Lawa River is a river in West Africa at . The river flows southwest into Liberia, where it enters the Lofa River in Lofa County.

Notes

Rivers of Guinea
Rivers of Liberia
International rivers of Africa